Double Diamond is the name of a design process model popularized by the British Design Council in 2005, and adapted from the divergence-convergence model proposed in 1996 by Hungarian-American linguist Béla H. Bánáthy. The two diamonds represent a process of exploring an issue more widely or deeply (divergent thinking) and then taking focused action (convergent thinking). It suggests that the design process should have four phases:

Discover: Understand the issue rather than merely assuming it. It involves speaking to and spending time with people who are affected by the issues.
Define: The insight gathered from the discovery phase can help to define the challenge in a different way.
Develop: Give different answers to the clearly defined problem, seeking inspiration from elsewhere and co-designing with a range of different people.
Deliver: Involves testing out different solutions at small-scale, rejecting those that will not work and improving the ones that will.

References

Design